La Vesvre de Saisy is a village in Burgundy.
It is part of the Commune of Saisy in Saône-et-Loire département

Villages in Saône-et-Loire